The Presence is a fictional character in comic books published by DC Comics. The character debuted in More Fun Comics #52 (February 1940), and was created by Jerry Siegel and Bernard Baily.

Publication history
The Presence first appears in More Fun Comics #52 as The Voice, the disembodied "Voice of the Presence" who empowers Jim Corrigan as the Spectre. It was created in this story by Jerry Siegel and Bernard Baily.

Continuities

DC Comics / DC Universe

The religious cosmology of the DC Universe is complex with many pantheons of deities co-existing alongside each other. It involves elements from multiple religions, mythologies, and modern created concepts such as the Endless. It is not always clear how the Abrahamic God fits into this—for example, one particular Wonder Woman storyline by Eric Luke featured the Greek Titans fighting Abrahamic angels and Hindu gods. According to writer Greg Rucka in an interview about his Final Crisis: Revelations miniseries: "The sort of unspoken rule in the DCU is that God sits above all others".

DC's superhero comics have always drawn upon Abrahamic religions for plot elements – the first appearance of "The Voice" was in the 1940 origin of the Spectre – but they have traditionally used surrogate concepts and names rather than refer to the Abrahamic deity directly. The comics are published under the Comics Code, a set of ethical guidelines drawn up in the 1950s in reaction to anti-comic book hysteria. The Code does not explicitly refer to God, but does say that "ridicule or attack on any religious or racial group is never permissible". Later revisions of the Code are phrased in terms of respecting religious beliefs and religious institutions, which may account for the comics' hesitancy when dealing with God.

The lack of a central doctrine means that multiple "aspects" of God have been introduced by different writers. Significant examples of God surrogates include:

The Voice
The disembodied "Voice of the Presence" that spoke to and empowered Jim Corrigan as the Spectre in More Fun Comics #52. This is the most "active" version of God seen in the comic books. At one point, it even answers the Spectre's prayers by resurrecting the murdered Justice Society of America. When the Voice uttered the first word, it created "The Word", and it was already being tracked by Destiny in his book.

The Hand
An image of a hand appearing out of a nebula has been referenced numerous times in different DC Comics as a metaphor for the creator or the mystery that exists at the moment of universal creation, but the identity of the being whom the hand belongs to varied over time. It was first seen in Green Lantern (vol. 2) #40. In Ganthet's Tale, it was revealed to be an illusion created by the Guardians to prevent investigation into the beginning of the universe. In Crisis on Infinite Earths #10, the Hand was turned into a predestination paradox as the hand of the villainous Anti-Monitor, who tried to rearrange all existence at its starting point but failed. The Hand was later seen reaching down from Heaven to embrace the invading Great Evil Beast, and stated to be the Hand of God by Etrigan.

This idea was visually called back to in DC Rebirth when a hand was seen reaching through time to change history. The true identity of the one manipulating this timeline was later revealed to be Doctor Manhattan.

The Source
The Source is a universal spirit from Jack Kirby's Fourth World cosmology.

The Presence
The Presence is an unseen Abrahamic deity from Grant Morrison's fictional angel mythology.

"Wally"
A being claiming to be a manifestation of God who appears in the form of a young boy wearing a baseball hat. He first appears in Peter David's Linda Danvers/Supergirl series. A similar character later appears in the same author's Fallen Angel series.

The Metaverse
In Doomsday Clock #10, Doctor Manhattan deduced the DC Universe acts as "Metaverse" in constant change, and when Manhattan created the New 52 timeline, the Metaverse decided to fight back through Wally West. Whether this Metaverse is another form of the Presence himself remains to be confirmed.

Other references
Many references to similar beings appear to be obvious references to the Abrahamic supreme deity, but they are sometimes revealed to be other entities in the DC Universe. Some events from Abrahamic mythology are assumed to be a part of the fictional timeline of the DC Universe, but they often involve significant artistic license. For example, it was Eclipso (the original agent of God's wrath) who caused the mythological Great Flood, and it was his replacement, the Spectre, who unleashed the ten plagues on Egypt and later parted the Red Sea for Moses. The DC Universe is repeatedly shown to have been created via a variation of the Big Bang and human evolution through natural selection, yet paradoxically it also has a Garden of Eden and a version of Lilith, Adam's first wife (e.g., Peter David's Supergirl series). A hint to reconcile this occurs in a Sandman issue (reprinted in Fables and Reflections) in which Cain, Abel, and Eve tell a story to Daniel Hall (grandson of Carter Hall) about their past and Abel says, "Oh, this whu-wasn't on Earth, thuh thu--" before being hushed.

According to the series Lucifer, the Presence has vacated his creation, and his granddaughter Elaine Belloc has taken his place. The series does not address his relationship to the other aspects, and its events have largely been ignored by subsequent authors.

In another story, the fallen archangel Asmodel invades the Silver City with an army of Bull-Host angels and Neron's demons to claim the Throne of God, only to be told by Zauriel that the Presence was not, in actuality, truly sitting upon a throne in the highest Heaven—he was part of everything and everyone, part of Heaven and Earth and perhaps even Hell itself, and thus could never be dethroned by any rebel, be they mortal or angel. Asmodel is stripped of his angelic powers and condemned to Hell by the Presence to burn for eternity for his treachery.

Vertigo Comics and DC Black Label
In Hellblazer #64, it is said (but not confirmed as the one saying it was a villain who already had a bad view of God) that Jesus was conceived from the archangel Gabriel's rape of a woman named Mary ("He'd committed rape behind a carpenter's in Nazareth, and a cycle of agony began that ended on a hill above Jerusalem...").

In Neil Gaiman's The Sandman mythos, the Presence's angelic servants are shown as residents of the Silver City, a place that is styled upon "Paradise" or "Heaven"; it was initially referred to as a separate place, but has since been equated with Heaven. Within the city there are two towers. At the top of the tallest tower, the Tower of Unendingly High, is the Primum Mobile, the Throne of Light, where God resides. Angels can only approach the Throne if they are summoned there. The second, shorter tower contains an audience chamber where the voice of God, the Logos, can be heard. Sandman's God is, again, never explicitly referred to by name, and is in fact rarely mentioned at all, save an exchange between Anubis and an angel in Season of Mists: "On whose authority?"; "Whose do you think?"

The Sandman series weaves an explanation for the many mythical deities apart from the Presence in the DC Universe. They are described as originating in Dream's realm, born out of people's wishes and fears. They take their power from prayers sent to them and die when they are no longer revered and ultimately forgotten.

A significant character in the Sandman series is the fallen angel Lucifer Morningstar, who rules in Hell. In Season of Mists, he renounces his throne and leaves Hell. His story, and the quasi-Biblical references surrounding him, is expanded upon in Mike Carey's Lucifer series. God, the Presence, in that series is referred to by name as Yahweh. He is the father of Lucifer and Michael Demiurgos. The Lucifer series depicts gods from religions other than the three monotheistic Abrahamic religions, including formless gods dreamt up by the earliest humans before the advent of language, and even tiny, short-lived crustacean gods originating from the hopes and fears of shrimp. Since the end of the series, the Presence has vacated his creation and his granddaughter Elaine Belloc has taken his place. How this affects other aspects of the Presence has yet to be seen.

Powers and abilities
The Presence is the incarnation of the Abrahamic God in the DC Universe.

The Presence has the ability to empower various angels, including the Spectre, Eclipso, and Michael Demiurgos. The Presence could resurrect the dead. When the fallen angel Asmodel invaded the Silver City in an attempt to destroy the Presence, it was stated that the Presence is everywhere and cannot be destroyed.

Although the Presence has stated in Lucifer that He is infinite and eternal, He also said that He was shaped by external forces. It is safe to note though, that He just speaks in reference to the "Collective Unconscious" giving Him shape. He at his utmost highest form is beyond such concepts and transcends all things. In volume 2 of the Lucifer series, He was temporarily killed or severely damaged by one of His fallen archangels, wielding a sword of His own creation. Though it should also be noted this was an aspect of His infinite being as He even says Himself in Lucifer #75.

Due to the Lucifer series being set in the Vertigo Universe, which may or may not sit apart from the main DCU, this may only apply to the current Vertigo version of the Presence and not the Presence of the DCU itself, although this was no longer supportable since DC's The New 52 merged Vertigo, WildStorm, and Milestone together. This is supported by the fact that the Presence is alive (and unchanged) in the main DCU.

In other media
 The "Hand of the Creator", from the Green Lantern comics and the Crisis, made an appearance in the Justice League Unlimited episode "The Once and Future Thing, Part 2: Time Warped". It is seen toward the end of the episode when Batman and Green Lantern chase Chronos to the beginning of time. Chronos hoped that by traveling there, he could become God.
 The "Hand of the Creator" also appears in the Green Lantern: The Animated Series finale "Dark Matter". After obtaining the device used for time traveling from the Anti-Monitor's head, the corrupted Aya used it to travel to the beginning of time to manipulate the hand in an attempt to make it so that the universe would be created without organic life. After badly injuring Razer, Aya returned to her normal self and then manipulated the hand again so that the creation of the world would proceed as normal.
 God is mentioned several times in the Arrowverse shows.
 God appears in the fifth season of Lucifer, portrayed by Dennis Haysbert.

See also
One Above All, a similar godlike character and Supreme Being in Marvel Comics.
The Man of Miracles, a similar godlike character and Supreme Being in Image Comics

References

External links
Presence at the DC Comics Database

Characters created by Jerry Siegel
Comics characters introduced in 1940
DC Comics characters who can teleport
DC Comics characters with superhuman strength
DC Comics deities
DC Comics fantasy characters
DC Comics characters who are shapeshifters
DC Comics telepaths
Fictional characters who can manipulate reality
Fictional characters with immortality
Fictional emperors and empresses
Fiction about God
Mythology in DC Comics